Victor Mudrac (born 3 March 1994) is a Moldavian professional footballer who plays as a centre-back for Moldovan Super Liga club Petrocub Hîncești.

References

External links

Profile at FC Dinamo Auto

1994 births
Living people
Moldovan footballers
Association football forwards
Moldova youth international footballers
Moldova international footballers
Moldovan expatriate footballers
CSF Bălți players
FC Dinamo-Auto Tiraspol players
FC Dacia Chișinău players
CS Petrocub Hîncești players
FC Alashkert players
FC Slavia Mozyr players
FC Saburtalo Tbilisi players
Moldovan Super Liga players
Armenian Premier League players
Belarusian Premier League players
Erovnuli Liga players
Expatriate footballers in Armenia
Moldovan expatriate sportspeople in Armenia
Expatriate footballers in Belarus
Moldovan expatriate sportspeople in Belarus
Expatriate footballers in Georgia (country)
Moldovan expatriate sportspeople in Georgia (country)